The Jahaj Kothi Museum in Hisar, Haryana, India, originally an 18th-century Jain temple which was also the residence of George Thomas ( – 22 August 1802) and James Skinner ( – 1841), is located inside the Firoz Shah Palace Complex which lies in front of Hisar Bus Stand.

History
Jahaj Kothi Museum is a later era building located inside Firoz Shah Palace Complex and maintained by Archaeological Survey of India. It was originally a Jain temple which was later used as residence by the Irish mercenary adventurer George Thomas ( – 22 August 1802).

George's father was a poor Catholic tenant farmer near Roscrea who died when George was a child. Originally press-ganged at Youghal, where he worked as a labourer on the docks, Thomas deserted from the British Navy in Madras in 1781. Still illiterate, he led a group of Pindaris north to Delhi by 1787, where he took service under Begum Samru of Sardhana. Supplanted in her favour by a Frenchman, he transferred his allegiance to Appa Rao, a Mahratta chieftain.  He carved out an independent kingdom in the districts of Rohtak and Hissar and made Hansi as his capital. During his short period of rule, he established a mint in Hansi and released rupees of his own kingdom. His area of control included area from Ghaggar to Beri in south and from Meham to Baharda in west. He rebuilt Hansi, which was in ruined state and built defensive walls and fortifications.

In 1796 AD, George rebuilt Jahaj Kothi at Hisar, Haryana which was his residence. He ruled the area independently up to 1801, when he was driven out by Sikh-Maratha-French confederacy. He was finally defeated and captured by Scindia's army under General Pierre Cuillier-Perron. He died on his way down the Ganges on 22 August 1802.

After George's defeat, this was taken over by James Skinner ( – 1841) who also used this as his residence. It lies near the locality called  or " bridge" which still exists in the form of a ramp road to its east between this building and auto market. Archaeological Survey of India use this as its site office and maintains a small museum inside.

Colonel James Skinner CB (1778 – 4 December 1841) was an Anglo-Indian military adventurer in India, who became known as  later in life, and is most known for two cavalry regiments he raised for the British, later known as 1st Skinner's Horse and 3rd Skinner's Horse (formerly 2nd Skinner's Horse) at Hansi in 1803, which still are a part of the Indian Army

Building material 
Built in 18th century, the building is constructed of burnt mud and clay bricks and mortar made of lime, sand, and surkhi. Surkhi is made by grinding to powder burnt bricks, brick-bats or burnt clay, used as a substitute for sand for concrete and mortar, has almost the same function as of sand but it also imparts some strength and hydraulicity.

Departments and collections
This zonal museum, maintained by the Haryana State Directorate of Archaeology & Museums, houses the collection of Jain artifacts and inscription stone of George Thomas in English and Persian who had renovated this building to use as his residence.

Gallery

External galleries
 Picture of inscription dating the earlier renovation to 1796 by George Thomas
 31-image  online picture gallery of Jahaj Kothi museum taken by American Institute of Indian Studies in 2008 CE
 Exterior-1 of Jahaj Kothi before the recent 21st century renovation
 Exterior-2 of Jahaj Kothi before the recent 21st century renovation
 Exterior-3 of Jahaj Kothi before the recent 21st century renovation
 Exterior-4 of Jahaj Kothi before the recent 21st century renovation
 Interior of Jahaj Kothi Museum

See also

 Khwaja Khizr Tomb at Sonipat
 Haryana State Museum at Panchkula
 Pranpir Badshah tomb, Panchyat Bhawan in Hisar Govt College ground
 Haryana Rural Antique Museum at HAU Hisar
 Rakhigarhi Indus Valley Civilisation Museum near Hisar
 Asigarh Fort
 Sheikhpura Kothi near Hansi
 Dharohar Museum at Kurukshetra University
 Kurukshetra Panorama and Science Centre at Kurukshetra
 Shrikrishna Museum at Kurukshetra
 Rewari Railway Heritage Museum at Rewari railway station

References

Museums in Haryana
Buildings and structures in Hisar (city)
Tourist attractions in Hisar district